Edwin Hill Handley (1806 – 2 May 1843) was an English cricketer with amateur status. He was associated with Cambridge University and made his first-class debut in 1827. He was educated at Harrow School and Trinity College, Cambridge.

References

1806 births
1843 deaths
English cricketers
English cricketers of 1826 to 1863
Cambridge University cricketers
People educated at Harrow School
Alumni of Trinity College, Cambridge